James Norley (5 January 1847 – 24 October 1900) was an English professional cricketer who played in the 1870s.

Norley was born at Canterbury in Kent and made his first-class cricket debut for Kent County Cricket Club in 1870. He played eight times for the side between 1870 and 1871 before making a single first-class appearance for Gloucestershire in 1877.

Norley's brother, Fred, played for Kent in the mid-1860s. Norley died in 1900 at Eastville near Bristol aged 53.

References

External links

1847 births
1900 deaths
English cricketers
Gloucestershire cricketers
Kent cricketers
Sportspeople from Canterbury